Choe Chung (984–1068) was a Korean Confucian scholar and poet of the Haeju Choe clan during the Goryeo period. He has been called the grandfather of the Korean educational system.

Family
Father: Choe On (최온, 崔溫)
1st son: Choe Yu-seon (최유선, 崔惟善)
2nd son: Choe Yu-gil (최유길, 崔惟吉)
Daughter: Lady Choe (부인 최씨, 夫人 崔氏)
Son-in-law: Gim Seong-su (김성수, 金成洙)

References

Korean Confucianists
984 births
1068 deaths
Korean educators
Choe clan of Haeju
11th-century Korean philosophers